Trumped! was an American daily talk radio program that was hosted by American businessman Donald Trump. It ran from 2004 to 2008.

History
Donald Trump had contacted Infinity Broadcasting Corporation and Clear Channel Communications, both of which had interest in having him do a radio program. Trump chose Clear Channel, to do a 90-second program. Trumped! was announced on April 29, 2004. The program was to feature Trump discussing economic, political, and pop cultural matters. Trump's commentaries were to last 60 to 90 seconds, and would air in the morning. Friday segments would feature Trump discussing his decision to fire each contestant on the previous night's new episode of The Apprentice. Prior to the program's launch, Office Depot signed up to sponsor the program as part of a deal in which Trump would read the company's ads on the air.

Trumped! began airing on Trump's 58th birthday: June 14, 2004. The program had the largest launch in radio history, premiering on 320 Clear Channel stations. Trump hosted the program from his New York office. On the program Trump expressed his views on current events, life, sports, entertainment, finance, economics, business, real estate, and politics. An October 2004 newspaper gives a length of two minutes for the program.

As of February 2006, Trumped! aired on approximately 400 Clear Channel stations. Trump made approximately 1,000 appearances on the show before it ended in 2008.

See also
List of things named after Donald Trump

References

External links
Official website, archived via the Wayback Machine

2004 radio programme debuts
2008 radio programme endings
American talk radio programs
Assets owned by the Trump Organization